Events in the year 1891 in Portugal.

Incumbents
Monarch: Carlos I 
President of the Council of Ministers: João Crisóstomo de Abreu e Sousa

Events
 January - Rebellion in Porto
 11 February - Establishment of the Mozambique Company.
 November - Opening of the Belmond Reid's Palace hotel, in Funchal, Madeira.
 Anglo-Portuguese Treaty of 1891
 Opening of the original line of the Funicular dos Guindais, in Porto.

Births
 21 January - Francisco Lázaro, Olympic marathon runner (died 1912)
 29 January - António de Menezes, fencer (died 1961)
 25 February - Alfredo Marceneiro, fado singer (died 1982)
 11 October - Armandinho, fado guitarist and composer (died 1946)
 28 December - António Eça de Queiroz, monarchist politician and agitator, government official (died 1968)
 Guilherme Rebelo de Andrade, architect (died 1969)

Deaths
 24 February - Miguel António de Sousa Horta Almeida e Vasconcelos, 2nd Baron of Santa Comba Dão, nobleman (born 1831)
 11 September - Antero de Quental, poet, philosopher, writer (born 1842)
 4 November - Francisco Gomes de Amorim, poet, dramatist (born 1827)

See also
List of colonial governors in 1891#Portugal

References

 
Portugal
Years of the 19th century in Portugal
Portugal